Axali gazetʻi (meaning the New Newspaper in English) is a weekly newspaper published in Georgia. It is based in the city of Kutaisi. The paper is published on a weekly basis and is owned by Ekaterine Bobokhidze.

References

External links
Official site

Georgian-language newspapers
Mass media in Kutaisi
Newspapers published in Georgia (country)
Publications with year of establishment missing
Weekly newspapers